The Pennamaquan River is a short,  river in the U.S. state of Maine, draining from medium-sized, low-elevation Pennamaquan Lake into Cobscook Bay.

Course 
The river flows southeast for about  before turning briefly south for about  before entering Cobscook Bay.

Tributaries 
Of Pennamaquan Lake

Taylor Brook
Moosehorn Brook
Round Lake
Ohio Brook

Of the main river

Crow Brook

See also
List of rivers in Maine

References 

Rivers of Maine
Rivers of Washington County, Maine